David Barbona (born 22 February 1995) is an Argentine footballer who plays as a midfielder for Defensa y Justicia.

External links
 
 David Barbona at salarysport.com

References

1995 births
Living people
Argentine footballers
Association football midfielders
Argentine Primera División players
Primera Nacional players
Liga MX players
Estudiantes de La Plata footballers
Nueva Chicago footballers
Atlético Tucumán footballers
Racing Club de Avellaneda footballers
Club Tijuana footballers
Footballers from Buenos Aires
Argentine expatriate footballers
Argentine expatriate sportspeople in Mexico
Expatriate footballers in Mexico